Little Bear Brook is a tributary of the Millstone River in Mercer County, New Jersey in the United States.

Course

Sister tributaries
Beden Brook
Bear Brook
Cranbury Brook
Devils Brook
Harrys Brook
Heathcote Brook
Indian Run Brook
Millstone Brook
Peace Brook
Rocky Brook
Royce Brook
Simonson Brook
Six Mile Run
Stony Brook
Ten Mile Run
Van Horn Brook

See also
List of rivers of New Jersey

References

External links
USGS Coordinates in Google Maps

Rivers of Mercer County, New Jersey
Tributaries of the Raritan River
Rivers of New Jersey